Louis Joseph Vasseur (24 January 1885 – 11 October 1968) was a French weightlifter and athlete who won a silver medal at the 1906 World Weightlifting Championships. He held the national titles in the discus throw (1906) and shot put (1909). His younger brother Alfred competed nationally in the javelin throw.

References

1885 births
1968 deaths
French male shot putters
French male discus throwers
French male weightlifters
Sportspeople from Roubaix
20th-century French people